Fano Jazz by the Sea is an annual jazz festival held in Fano, Italy since 1993. It is usually held at the end of July.

History 
Originally born as marine side event of the festival Umbria Jazz under the name Umbria Jazz by the Sea in 1991, took his current name two years later.

Artists 
Below is the list of some of the best known artists who have performed at Fano Jazz by The Sea since its inception, listed in appearance order, with the year(s) in brackets.
Paquito D'Rivera (1993, 2013)
Lionel Hampton (1994)
James Carter (1995, 2004, 2010)
McCoy Tyner (1996, 2007)
Enrico Rava (1996, 2009, 2010, 2011, 2015, 2019)
Paolo Fresu (1996, 2002, 2012, 2014, 2015, 2017, 2018, 2019, 2020)
Michel Petrucciani (1997)
Chick Corea (1998)
Dee Dee Bridgewater (1999, 2006, 2012, 2018)
Herbie Hancock (2000)
John Scofield (2001, 2005, 2016, 2017)
Joshua Redman (2001, 2015, 2019)
Gonzalo Rubalcaba (2003, 2016, 2021)
Michel Portal (2003, 2006, 2008, 2015, 2021)
Marcus Miller (2003, 2005, 2010)
Nils Petter Molvær (2004, 2021)
Wynton Marsalis (2004)
Joe Zawinul (2005)
Maceo Parker (2006, 2010)
Mike Stern (2007, 2012)
Stefano Bollani (2007, 2008, 2010)
Trilok Gurtu (2009, 2011, 2013, 2017)
John McLaughlin (2011)
Hiromi (2011)
Noa (2012, 2016, 2022)
Brad Mehldau (2012, 2016, 2018)
Brian Auger (2014)
Fred Wesley (2014, 2022)
Michael Nyman (2017)
Stanley Clarke (2018)
Terence Blanchard (2019)
Jacob Collier (2019)
Michael League (2020)
Aymée Nuviola (2021)
Sons of Kemet (2022)
Louis Cole (2022)
GoGo Penguin (2022)

References

External links

 

Jazz festivals in Italy
Culture in le Marche